Like all municipalities of Puerto Rico, Guaynabo is subdivided into administrative units called barrios, which are roughly comparable to minor civil divisions, (and means wards or boroughs or neighborhoods in English). The barrios and subbarrios, in turn, are further subdivided into smaller local populated place areas/units called sectores (sectors in English). The types of sectores may vary, from normally sector to urbanización to reparto to barriada to residencial, among others. Some sectors appear in two barrios.

List of sectors by barrio

Camarones
	
	Barrio Camarones Centro 
	Calle Amapola 
	Calle Los López 
	Calle Los Pinos 
	Condominios Alamanda 
	Egida Mi Sagrada Familia
	Sector Altos de Camarones 
	Sector Apama 
	Sector El Cementerio 
	Sector El Hoyo 
	Sector La Pachanga 
	Sector La Pagana 
	Sector Los Angeles 
	Sector Los Cabellos 
	Sector Los Condenados 
	Sector Los Guayabo 
	Sector Los López 
	Sector Los Machuca 
	Sector Los Manzanos 
	Sector Mangotín 
	Sector Manhattan 
	Sector Morán 
	Sector Moscú 
	Sector Petra Ortiz 
	Sector Puente Salomón Rondón 
	Sector Rogelio García 
	Sector Sánchez López 
	Sector Siso Nazario 
	Short Hills 
	Urbanización Estancias de APAMA I y II

Frailes
	
	Apartamentos Valles de Torrimar 
	Avenida Los Filtros 
	Barriada Cano 
	Barriada Cruz Meléndez 
	Barrio Frailes Llano 
	Barrio Piedras Blancas 
	Calle Casimiro Villegas 
	Calle Juan Martínez 
	Calle Ramón Murgas 
	Calle Vandal 
	Calle Villegas Valcarcel 
	Comunidad Los Frailes 
	Condominios Alta Vista 
	Condominios Altos de Torrimar I, II, III, IV, V, y VI
	Condominios Alturas de Piedras Blancas 
	Condominios Arboleda 
	Condominios Athrium Park (Condominios Santa Paula) 
	Condominios Baldwin Gate 
	Condominios Boulevard del Río I y II 
	Condominios Casa Maggiore 
	Condominios Chalets de Altavista 
	Condominios Égida CIA de P.R. 
	Condominios El Bosque de La Villa de Torrimar 
	Condominios El Bosque 
	Condominios El Palmar de Torrimar 
	Condominios Emerald Court (Mansiones de Esmeralda) 
	Condominios Feliciano 
	Condominios Four Winds 
	Condominios Frailes Norte 
	Condominios Gemini 
	Condominios Granada Park 
	Condominios Hannia María 
	Condominios Hills View Plaza 
	Condominios Jardines de Los Filtros 
	Condominios La Cima 
	Condominios La Ciudadela Nordeste 
	Condominios La Ciudadela 
	Condominios La Villa Gardens 
	Condominios Lincoln Park 
	Condominios Málaga Park 
	Condominios Monte de los Frailes 
	Condominios Monte Palacium 
	Condominios Monte Verde 
	Condominios Montesol 
	Condominios Parkville Plaza 
	Condominios Parque de Los Frailes Town Houses 
	Condominios Parque San Ramón 
	Condominios Plaza de Torrimar I y II 
	Condominios Plaza del Prado 
	Condominios Plaza Esmeralda 
	Condominios Portales de Alhelí 
	Condominios Prados del Monte 
	Condominios Quinta Valle I y II 
	Condominios Regency Park 
	Condominios Ridge Top
	Condominios San Francisco Javier 
	Condominios San Martín Twin Tower 
	Condominios The Falls 
	Condominios Torre San Miguel 
	Condominios Torremolinos 
	Condominios Torres de los Frailes 
	Condominios Torrimar Plaza 
	Condominios Torrimar Town Park A y B 
	Condominios Villa Cerro Real 
	Condominios Villa de la Fuente 
	Condominios Villa Los Filtros 
	Condominios Villas de Parkville I y II 
	Condominios Vista de los Frailes 
	Condominios Vista La Colina 
	Extensión Muñoz Rivera 
	Hogar Parkville Home Elderly Care Center 
	Reparto Apolo 
	Residencial Rafael Martínez Nadal 
	Residencial Rosaleda 
	Sector Abril Llopiz 
	Sector Casimiro Villegas 
	Sector Cátala 
	Sector El Último Chance (Yambele) 
	Sector La Lomita 
	Sector Las Bombas (Calle Picus) 
	Sector Los Abreu 
	Sector Los Báez 
	Sector Los Burgos 
	Sector Los Caraballo 
	Sector Los Cosme 
	Sector Los Filtros 
	Sector Los García 
	Sector Los Romero 
	Sector Los Tacos 
	Sector Mariquita 
	Sector Meliá 
	Sector Ortiz 
	Sector Peñagarícano 
	Sector Pucho Huertas 
	Sector Valcárcel 
	Urbanización Alto Apolo Estates 
	Urbanización Alto Apolo 
	Urbanización Altos de Torrimar 
	Urbanización Alturas de Torrimar 
	Urbanización Apolo 
	Urbanización Artesia 
	Urbanización Baldwin Park 
	Urbanización Bellomonte 
	Urbanización Bosque de los Frailes 
	Urbanización Casa Linda Village
	Urbanización Cerro Real 
	Urbanización Chalets de Santa Clara 
	Urbanización Colinas de Parkville 
	Urbanización El Álamo 
	Urbanización El Jardín 
	Urbanización Estancias de Guaynabo 
	Urbanización Estancias de Torrimar 
	Urbanización Estancias del Parque (Villas del Parque) 
	Urbanización Frailes Lomas 
	Urbanización Frailes Norte 
	Urbanización Highland Gardens 
	Urbanización La Lomita 
	Urbanización La Villa de Torrimar
	Urbanización Las Villas Town Houses 
	Urbanización Las Villas 
	Urbanización Lomas Chalets (Toño Fuentes) 
	Urbanización Los Frailes Sur 
	Urbanización Los Frailes 
	Urbanización Mallorca 
	Urbanización Mansiones de Parkville 
	Urbanización Mansiones de Santa Paula 
	Urbanización Mansiones de Torrimar 
	Urbanización Martin Court 
	Urbanización Monte Alvernia 
	Urbanización Monte Apolo Estate 
	Urbanización Monte Olimpo 
	Urbanización Muñoz Rivera 
	Urbanización Oasis Gardens 
	Urbanización Parkville Court 
	Urbanización Parkville Terrace 
	Urbanización Parkville y Extensión Parkville Town House 
	Urbanización Parque de Torremolinos 
	Urbanización Parque Mediterráneo 
	Urbanización Ponce de León 
	Urbanización Prado Alto 
	Urbanización Quintas de los Frailes 
	Urbanización Quintas de Parkville 
	Urbanización San Francisco Javier 
	Urbanización Santa Clara 
	Urbanización Santiago Iglesias 
	Urbanización Sevilla Biltmore 
	Urbanización Torremolinos Este 
	Urbanización Torremolinos 
	Urbanización Torrimar 
	Urbanización Villa Ávila 
	Urbanización Villa Clementina 
	Urbanización Villa Lissette 
	Urbanización Villa Rita 
	Urbanización Villas de Tívoli 
	Urbanización y Extensión Las Colinas 
	Urbanización y Extensión Santa Paula

Guaraguao
	
	Calle Ceiba 
	Calle Diamante 
	Calle Flamboyán 
	Calle Jazmín 
	Calle La Vega 
	Calle Laguna 
	Calle Manantial 
	Calle Peña 
	Calle Rosado 
	Calle Saturno 
	Parcelas López Caces 
	Sector Benito Guzmán 
	Sector Cabrera 
	Sector Carrillo 
	Sector Corea 
	Sector Elipio Pérez 
	Sector Estrella 
	Sector Figueroa 
	Sector Guerra 
	Sector Juana Ramos 
	Sector La Brecha 
	Sector La Muralla 
	Sector La Vega 
	Sector Landrau 
	Sector Los Báez 
	Sector Los Cintrón 
	Sector Los Lagunas 
	Sector Los Motores 
	Sector Los Sánchez 
	Sector Monte Comunal 
	Sector Peña 
	Sector Puerto Nuevo 
	Sector Romero 
	Sector Villa Isleña 
	Urbanización Nieves Padilla

Guaynabo barrio-pueblo
	
	Barriada Fuentes 
	Barrio Frailes Llano 
	Condominios Altos Reales 
	Condominios Balcones de Guaynabo
	Condominios Balcones de San Pedro 
	Condominios Chalets del Parque 
	Condominios Monte Mayor 
	Condominios Murano Luxury Apartments 
	Condominios Palmar del Río 
	Condominios Parque Real 
	Condominios Plaza del Palmar 
	Condominios Portal de Sofía 
	Condominios Villas de Guaynabo 
	Hogar Golden Retirement 
	Reparto Piñeiro 
	Residencial Jardines de Guaynabo 
	Residencial Villas de Mabó 
	Sector Cubita 
	Sector Guzmán 
	Sector Honduras 
	Sector Marrero 
	Urbanización Colimar 
	Urbanización Colinas Metropolitanas 
	Urbanización Estancias Reales 
	Urbanización Mansiones de Guaynabo 
	Urbanización Mansiones Reales 
	Urbanización Palma Real 
	Urbanización Quintas Reales 
	Urbanización Reparto Esperanza 
	Urbanización Villas Reales

Hato Nuevo
	
	Brisas del Caribe 
	Calle Paseo de Matilde 
	Calle Santa Ana 
	Camino Los Navarro 
	Camino Sylvia Rodríguez 
	Comunidad Alturas de Lomas de Sol 
	Sector Capó 
	Sector El Coco 
	Sector El Faro 
	Sector El Laberinto  
	Sector Feliciano 
	Sector Hato Nuevo II 
	Sector Inclán 
	Sector Jorge García 
	Sector La Pajilla 
   Sector La Paloma
	Sector La Vereda 
	Sector Limones 
	Sector Lomas del Sol 
	Sector O’Neill Casañas 
	Sector Valle Las Flores 
	Urbanización Bel-Air 
	Urbanización Colina Mabó 
	Urbanización Finca Elena 
	Urbanización Greenville 
	Urbanización Lomas del Sol 
	Urbanización Mountain View 
	Urbanización Valle Escondido Estates 
	Urbanización Villa Mercedes

Mamey
	
	Barrio Mamey I 
	Calle Domingo González Lugo 
	Sector Antonio González 
	Sector Barrio Mamey II 
	Sector Cancel 
	Sector Carrillo 
	Sector Centeno 
	Sector Félix Urbina 
	Sector Figueroa 
	Sector Garcia 
	Sector Julio Pietro 
	Sector Los Castro 
	Sector Los Lagunas 
	Sector Paso Hondo 
	Sector Pedro Reyes 
	Sector Rivera Rosado

Pueblo Viejo
	
	Apartamentos Gallardo 
	Barriada San Miguel 
	Barriada Vietnam 
	Barrio Juan Domingo 
	Barrio Sabana 
	Buchanan 
	Calle Emilia 
	Calle Flamboyán 
	Calle Pedro Pedroza 
	Calle San Miguel 
	Calle Wilson 
	Callejón Caridad 
	Comunidad Amelia
	Condominios Acgualina 
	Condominios Amarillys 
   Condominios Arcos de Suchville 
	Condominios Art At San Patricio 
	Condominios Asizi 
	Condominios Bel-Air 
	Condominios Belén 
	Condominios Caparra Chalets 
	Condominios Caparra Classic 
	Condominios Caparra Hills Tower 
	Condominios Caparra Hills Village 
	Condominios Caparra Real 
	Condominios Casa Magna Court 
	Condominios Chalets de Caparra 
	Condominios Ciudad Condor 
	Condominios Colonial Court 
	Condominios Doral Plaza 
	Condominios El Cordovés 
	Condominios El Jardín 
	Condominios El Laurel 
	Condominios Garden Court 
	Condominios Garden Hills Chalets 
	Condominios Garden Hills Plaza I 
	Condominios Garden Hills Plaza II 
	Condominios Garden Hills Tower 
	Condominios Garden Hills Town Park 
	Condominios Garden Hills Villas 
	Condominios Garden Village 
	Condominios Gardenville 
	Condominios Generalife 
	Condominios IL’Villagio 
	Condominios L’Hermitage 
	Condominios Los Caobos Plaza 
	Condominios Los Patricios 
	Condominios Luis Muñoz Marín 
	Condominios Madre Selva 
	Condominios Mansiones de Garden Hills I y II 
	Condominios Mansiones Los Caobos 
	Condominios Meadows Towers 
	Condominios Milan Court 
	Condominios Miradores de Sabana 
	Condominios Novas Court Town Houses 
	Condominios Palm Circle 
	Condominios Park Royal 
	Condominios Parkside 
	Condominios Parque de Villa Caparra 
	Condominios Parque San Patricio I y II 
	Condominios Pisos de Caparra 
	Condominios Plaza Athenne 
	Condominios Plaza Real Caparra 
	Condominios Ponce de León 
	Condominios Portales de San Patricio 
	Condominios Porto Fino 
	Condominios Saint Morritz 
	Condominios San Patricio Apartamentos  
	Condominios San Patricio Chalets 
	Condominios San Patricio I y II 
	Condominios San Patricio Meadows 
	Condominios Santa Ana 
	Condominios Suchville Park 
	Condominios The Village At Suchville
	Condominios The Village 
	Condominios Torres de Caparra 
	Condominios Town Houses Villa Caparra 
	Condominios Vía Caparra 
	Condominios Villa Caparra Court 
	Condominios Villa Caparra Executive 
	Condominios Villa Caparra Plaza 
	Condominios Villa Caparra Tower 
	Condominios Villa Caparra Town Park 
	Hogar San José de la Montaña 
	Residencial Zenón Díaz Valcárcel 
	Sector Buen Samaritano 
	Sector Fondo del Saco 
	Sector Jerusalén 
	Sector La Esperanza 
	Sector Robles 
	Urbanización Alturas de San Patricio 
	Urbanización Arboleda 
	Urbanización Balcones de Sevilla 
	Urbanización Caparra Hills 
	Urbanización Caparra Town Park 
	Urbanización Chalets de la Reina 
	Urbanización Garden Hills Estate 
	Urbanización Garden Hills 
	Urbanización Georgetown 
	Urbanización Golden Gate 
	Urbanización Los Caobos Apartamentos 
	Urbanización Los Caobos 
	Urbanización Mansiones de Garden Hills 
	Urbanización Mansiones de Tintillo 
	Urbanización Parkside 
	Urbanización Parque de Villa Caparra 
	Urbanización Parque San Patricio 
	Urbanización San Patricio 
	Urbanización Suchville 
	Urbanización Sunset Harbor 
	Urbanización Susan Court
	Urbanización Terrazas de Tintillo
	Urbanización Tintillo Gardens 
	Urbanización Tintillo Hills
	Urbanización Tintillo 
	Urbanización Town House San Patricio 
	Urbanización Villa Concepción 1 y 2 
	Urbanización Villa de Flamboyán 
	Urbanización Villa Elsie 
	Urbanización Villa Trujillo 
	Urbanización Villa Verde 
	Urbanización Villas de Tintillo 
	Urbanización Y Extensión Villa Caparra 
	Víctor Braegger

Río

	Calle La 245 
	Calle Los García 
	Camino Avelino López 
	Camino Susano Rodríguez 
	Condominios Beverly Hills Court 
	Egida Asociación Miembros de la Policía 
	Sector Casa Rest Manor
	Sector El 24 
	Sector El Laberinto 
	Sector Gavillán 
	Sector La Curva 
	Sector La Muda 
	Sector La Palmita 
	Sector Los Canarios 
	Sector Los González y Hernández 
	Sector Los Villega 
	Sector Pedro Ramos 
	Sector Tomé 
	Sector Vallae Verde 
	Urbanización Beverly Hills 
	Urbanización Carmen Hills 
	Urbanización Linda Gardens 
	Urbanización Quintas de Beverly Hills 
	Urbanización Sunset Hills

Santa Rosa
	
	Barrio Santa Rosa I 
	Barrio Santa Rosa II 
	Barrio Santa Rosa III 
	Calle Buenos Aires 
	Calle Cándido Montijo 
	Calle del Parque 
	Calle El Nuevo Horizonte 
	Calle Flamboyán 
	Calle Jardines 
	Calle Monserrate 
	Calle Reymundí 
	Camino Juanillo Fuentes 
	Condominios D’ Villas 
	Condominios Grand View 
	Condominios Parque de Terranova 
	Condominios Pórticos de Guaynabo 
	Condominios Villa Providencia 
	Parcelas Huertas 
	Reparto Sector Villegas 
	Sector As de Oro 
	Sector Augusto Báez 
	Sector Campo Alegre 
	Sector Canta Gallo 
	Sector Cortijo 
	Sector El Hoyo 
	Sector El Junker 
	Sector El Llano 
	Sector Gavillán Rivera 
	Sector La Trinchera 
	Sector Las Bombas
	Sector Las Torres 
	Sector Los Báez 
	Sector Los Burgos 
	Sector Los Chinea 
	Sector Los López 
	Sector Los Marrero 
	Sector Los Nazario 
	Sector Los Ortegas 
	Sector Los Pérez 
	Sector Los Rentas 
	Sector Los Resto 
	Sector Lozada 
	Sector Marta Ortiz 
	Sector Moreno 
	Sector Negrón 
	Sector Rivera 
	Sector Rodríguez 
	Sector Varela 
	Sector Villa del Río 
	Urbanización Camino del Monte 
	Urbanización Colinas de Guaynabo 
	Urbanización La Fontana 
	Urbanización Las Rambas in Downtown 
	Urbanización Monte Cielo 
	Urbanización Riberas de Honduras 
	Urbanización Riverside 
	Urbanización Sierra Berdecía 
	Urbanización Terranova 
	Urbanización Vistas del Río 
	Urbanización Y Extensión Terrazas de Guaynabo
	Vistas de Guaynabo

Sonadora

	
	Carretera 174 (from km 13.4 to km 16.4) 
	Sector Antonio Báez 
	Sector El Alto 
	Sector El Gato 
	Sector Gilo Maldonado 
	Sector La Marquesa 
	Sector Las Parcelas 
	Sector Los Díaz 
	Sector Los Pérez 
	Sector Monzón 
	Sector Pueblo Viejo 
	Sector Sonadora Alta 
	Sector Sonadora Llana 
	Sector Toño Báez 
	Sector Viña

See also

 List of communities in Puerto Rico

References

Guaynabo
Guaynabo